Kenneth Keith Forbes  (July 4, 1892 – 1980) was a portrait and landscape painter. His painting entitled Canadian Artillery in action is on display at the Canadian War Museum.

Life
Born in Toronto, Ontario, Forbes was the son of John Colin Forbes, R.C.A. (1846–1925) a distinguished portraitist who painted such notable figures as William Gladstone, Sir Henry Campbell-Bannerman and Sir Wilfrid Laurier. John Forbes' penultimate commission was the portraits of King Edward VII and Queen Alexandra which were destroyed in the 1952 fire in the Parliamentary Library in Ottawa.

Kenneth Forbes studied first at the Newlyn School, Cornwall with Stanhope Forbes, where he won a four-year scholarship to the Hospitalfield House school, Arbroath, Scotland. He won a Chase Scholarship in London with a portrait sketch, and at 19 had a portrait accepted for exhibition at the Royal Academy. In all, twelve of Kenneth Forbes portraits were exhibited at the Royal Academy.

Forbes enlisted in the 10th "Pals" Battalion of the Royal Fusiliers in 1914 and was later commissioned from the ranks. He was wounded in action and gassed. Forbes ended his combat service as second in command of the 32nd Battalion, Machine Gun Corps. After being transferred to Lord Beaverbrook's Canadian War Memorials Fund in 1918, Forbes became an official Canadian war artist. Forbes was twice Mentioned in Dispatches for his service.

According to a Toronto newspaper report from April 1918, Forbes had recently received a commission from Lord Beaverbrook (Max Aitken) to paint a series of official war pictures at the front.

Forbes was also a successful amateur boxer, being light and middle weight champion of the University of London while attending the Slade School of Fine Art. He continued his boxing while in the army, becoming champion of the British Army's 111th Brigade.

In late 1918, Forbes married his wife Jean Mary Edgell, another art student, in London. They had a daughter, June Forbes McCormack

In 1953 Forbes resigned from the Ontario Society of Artists in protest against what he considered the unwarranted recognition and attention given to abstract and what was then called "modern art". In 1958 he resigned from the Royal Canadian Academy of Arts for the same reasons. He later published a short book, Great Art to the Grotesque with an introduction and biographical sketch by Roy Greenaway, as a full statement of his rejection of the artistic worth of abstract or "Modern Art".

In 1958, Forbes, Manley MacDonald, Victor Llewellyn Child, Gordon Roy Conn and others established the Ontario Institute of Painters as a body for traditional or "realist" artists. Members included Douglas Ferguson Elliott, J. R. Tate, and Marion Long.

Forbes was awarded the Thomas R. Proctor Prize for portraiture by the National Academy of Design, New York (Now known as the National Academy Museum and School) on two occasions: 1932 and 1939.

In 1967, he was made an Officer of the Order of Canada "for his contributions to the arts as a landscape and portrait painter". In 1972 he had a book published, Great Art to the Grotesque.

Kenneth Forbes died in Toronto on February 25, 1980.

Works

See also

 List of portraits in the Centre Block
 Canadian official war artists
 War artist
 War art

References

Bibliography 

 - Total pages: 67

 

1892 births
1980 deaths
20th-century Canadian painters
Canadian male painters
British Army personnel of World War I
Officers of the Order of Canada
Canadian war artists
Royal Fusiliers officers
Members of the Royal Canadian Academy of Arts
World War I artists
Machine Gun Corps officers
20th-century Canadian male artists